Su Dongpo is a 2012 Chinese historical TV series produced by China Central Television. It was first shown in 2012, although it was filmed in 2007.

The biopic stars Lu Yi as Su Shi, also known as Su Dongpo.

Cast
Lu Yi as Su Shi
Song haolin as Su Zhe
Niu Piao as: Su Xun
Ruby Lin as Wang Fu
Han Yuqin as Wang Runzhi
Sarina as Grand Empress Dowager Cao
Li Qiang as Emperor Renzong of Song
He Wei as Wang Anshi
Liu Wenzhi as Sima Guang
Shen Junyi as Fan Zheng
Wang Shihuai as Ouyang Xiu
Yang Dong as Chao Gu
Wang Xiaochen as Wang Chaoyun
Liu Changchun as Zhang Chun
Zhao Jin as Zhang Zao
Zhao Chao as Emperor Shenzong of Song
Wang Li as Emperor Zhezong of Song
Li Feng as Qin Guan
Xue Zhongrui as Han Qi
Liu Yulin as Wang Gui
Guo Donglin as Foyin
Shi Yao as Grand Empress Dowager Gao
Liu Yajin as Cai Jing
Zhou Bo as Cai Bian
Zhang Jinghai as Cai Que
Yang Yaxing as Yang Xiaolian
Jiang Zhigang as Su Mai
Gao Dai as Su Dai
Jin Hanning as Su Guo
Xia Zhixiang as Cheng Yi
Zhang Guisheng as Chen Xiliang
Song Song as Chen Zao
Xia Dandan as Liu Yue'e
Peng Gang as Zeng Gong
Zhao Yiran as Zeng Bu
Li Dongsheng as Wu Fugu
Chen Yongjian as Huang Tingjian
Yu Hongzhou as Wang Gong
Zhang Jing as Shi Yun
Shang Tielong as Li Ding
Wang Zhongdao as Lü Dafang
Zhang Daning as Canliaozi
Han Jianguang as Zhang Maoze
Dai Ming as Zhao Bian
Deng Lin as Lü Huiqing
Xu Feng as Fan Chunren
Huo Ercha as Liu Zhi
Zhang Yuanrong as Deng Wan
Bao Hailong as Wang Shen
Li Zhu as Mi Fu
Ding Jianjun as Lü Hui
Deng Ming as Wang Yansou
Sun Decheng as Hu Su
Hou Di as Liu Ji
Hu Zhanli as Wang Di
Wang Xiang as Shu Dan
Li Sa as Liang Weijian
Zhang Junjie as Wang Peng
Pan Xiaoqian as Xu Junyou
Hou Taop as Wu Gui
Guo Yan as Cao Yong
Song Yu as Wang Er
Tao Jisi as Qu Guinian
Ang Yang as Wang Xi
Wang Bo as Mai Ziqing
Jia Mengdai as Azhu
Chang Hong as Fan Ying

Television series set in the Northern Song
2012 Chinese television series debuts
2012 Chinese television series endings
Television series set in the 11th century
Fictional depictions of Su Shi in television
Chinese historical television series